The MRC Foundation Cup, registered as the Naturalism Stakes, is a Melbourne Racing Club Group 3 Thoroughbred open handicap horse race, over a distance of 2,000 metres. It is held annually at Caulfield Racecourse, Melbourne, Australia in September. Total prize money for the race is A$200,000.

History
The registered race is named after Naturalism, who won the 1993 Caulfield Stakes.
The Naturalism Stakes is a good guide to high-profile races later in the season, including the Caulfield Cup and the prestigious W S Cox Plate.

Since 2007 the race winner obtains a ballot exemption from the Caulfield Cup.

Grade
 The race was upgraded from a Listed race to Group 3 in 2009.

Distance
 1983–1993 – 1800 metres
 1994 onwards - 2000 metres

Name
 1983–1994 - VATC Royal Show Handicap
 1995–2001 - Naturalism Stakes 
 2002 - Emirates Airlines Stakes 
 2003 - Carnival Stakes 
 2004 - Dubai Duty Free Stakes 
 2005 - Nad Al Sheba Club Classic 
 2006–2014 - Naturalism Stakes 
 2015 - MRC Foundation Cup

Winners

 2022 - Smokin' Romans
 2021 - Nonconformist
 2020 - Orderofthegarter
 2019 - Brimham Rocks
 2018 - Night's Watch
 2017 - Harlem
 2016 - Jameka
 2015 - Magnapal
 2014 - Gris Caro
 2013 - Mr O'Ceirin
 2012 - Folding Gear
 2011 - December Draw
 2010 - Rainbow Styling
 2009 - Red Lord
 2008 - Zagreb
 2007 - Douro Valley
 2006 - Zipping
 2005 - Sarrera
 2004 - Confectioner
 2003 - Rose Archway
 2002 - Pentastic
 2001 - Inaflury
 2000 - Celestial Show
 1999 - Second Coming
 1998 - Our Unicorn
 1997 - Skybeau
 1996 - Peep On The Sly
 1995 - Campaign Warrior
 1994 - Top Rating
 1993 - Golden Serpent
 1992 - Three Pals
 1991 - Newbury Star
 1990 - Just A Dancer
 1989 - Tiendi
 1988 - Ebeli Show
 1987 - Tristram
 1986 - Sea Legend
 1985 - Top Banner
 1984 - Mapperley Heights
 1983 - Mevron Boy

See also
 List of Australian Group races
 Group races

References

Horse races in Australia